Bomboli (also Bombongo) and Bozaba constitute a Bantu language of the Democratic Republic of the Congo. Bomboli is spoken in the towns of Kungu and Dongo in the Sud-Ubangi province, specifically on a canal flowing into Ngiri river, north of Bomongo. Bozaba is spoken northwest of the confluence of the Ngiri and Mwanda rivers, in Kungu territory, Mwanda collectivité.

References

Ngondi-Ngiri languages